Straffordville Airport  was located  southwest of Straffordville, Ontario, Canada.

References

Defunct airports in Ontario